Digital goods or e-goods are intangible goods that exist in digital form. Examples are Wikipedia articles; digital media, such as e-books, downloadable music, internet radio, internet television and streaming media; fonts, logos, photos and graphics; digital subscriptions; online ads (as purchased by the advertiser); internet coupons; electronic tickets; electronically treated documentation in many different fields; downloadable software (Digital Distribution) and mobile apps; cloud-based applications and online games; virtual goods used within the virtual economies of online games and communities; workbooks; worksheets; planners; e-learning (online courses); webinars, video tutorials, blog posts; cards; patterns; website themes; templates.

Legal concerns about digital goods 
Special legal concerns regarding digital goods include copyright infringement and taxation.

Also the question of the ownership (versus licensed use or service only) of purely digital goods is not finally resolved. For instance, the software installers of the digital software distributor gog.com are technically independent to the account but are still subject to the EULA, where a "licensed, not sold" formulation is used. Therefore it is not clear if the software can be legally used after a hypothetical loss of the account; a question which was also raised before in practice for the similar service Steam. In July 2012, for instance for the European Union the European Court of Justice ruled in the case UsedSoft vs. Oracle that the sale of a software product, either through a physical support or download, constituted a transfer of ownership in EU law, thus the first sale doctrine applies; the ruling thereby breaks the "licensed, not sold" legal theory, but leaves open numerous questions. Therefore it is also permissible to resell software licenses even if the digital good has been downloaded directly from the Internet, as the first-sale doctrine applied whenever software was originally sold to a customer for an unlimited amount of time, thus prohibiting any software maker from preventing the resale of their software by any of their legitimate owners. The court requires that the previous owner must no longer be able to use the licensed software after the resale, but finds that the practical difficulties in enforcing this clause should not be an obstacle to authorizing resale, as they are also present for software which can be installed from physical supports, where the first-sale doctrine is in force. The ruling applies to the European Union, but could indirectly find its way to North America; moreover the situation could entice publishers to offer platforms for a secondary market.

See also
 E-commerce
 Digital currency
 Digital Distribution
 Digital goods auction
 Intellectual Property
 Digital asset

References

Digital media
Mass media technology